The 2020 Bas-Rhin municipal elections took place on 15 March 2020, with a second round of voting initially expected for 22 March 2020. Like the rest of France, the second round was initially suspended due to the COVID-19 pandemic. On 22 May, Prime Minister Édouard Philippe announced that the second round of voting would take place on the 28th of June.

Incumbent and elected mayors 
Right-wing politicians have remained largely dominant in the department. Already weakened during the last elections by losses in Schweighouse-sur-Moder, Vendenheim and Schiltigheim. The left lost further ground in Erstein, Illkirch-Graffenstaden and Ostwald to the benefit of centrist and unaffiliated candidates. Even with divisions in her list during the second round of voting, Jeanne Baseghian, the mayoral candidate for Europe Écologie Les Verts, was able to maintain control of Strasbourg for the left.

Results by number of mayors elected

Results in communes with more than 5,000 residents

Barr 

 Incumbent mayor: Gilbert Scholly (LR)
 29 seats to be elected to the conseil municipal (population in 2017: 7,238 residents)
 12 seats to be elected to the conseil communautaire (CC du Pays de Barr)

Benfeld 

Incumbent mayor: Jacky Wolfarth (DVD)
 29 seats to be elected to the conseil municipal (population in 2017: 5,753 residents)
 6 seats to be elected to the conseil communautaire (CC du Canton d'Erstein)

Bischheim 

Incumbent mayor: Jean-Louis Hoerlé (LR)
 33 seats to be elected to the conseil municipal (population in 2017: 17,093 residents)
 3 seats to be elected to the conseil communautaire (Eurométropole de Strasbourg)

Bischwiller 

Incumbent mayor: Jean-Lucien Netzer (MoDem)
 33 seats to be elected to the conseil municipal (population in 2017: 12,538 residents)
 8 seats to be elected to the conseil communautaire (CA de Haguenau)

Brumath 

Incumbent mayor: Etienne Wolf (LR)
 29 seats to be elected to the conseil municipal (population in 2017:  9,986 residents)
 6 seats to be elected to the conseil communautaire (CA de Haguenau)

Drusenheim 

Incumbent mayor: Jacky Keller (LR)
 29 seats to be elected to the conseil municipal (population in 2017: 5,154 residents)
 6 seats to be elected to the conseil communautaire (CC du Pays Rhénan)

Eckbolsheim 

Incumbent mayor: André Lobstein (LR)
 29 seats to be elected to the conseil municipal (population in 2017:  6,857 residents)
 1 seats to be elected to the conseil communautaire (Eurométropole de Strasbourg)

Erstein 

Incumbent mayor: Jean-Marc Willer (DVG)
 33 seats to be elected to the conseil municipal (population in 2017: 10,630 residents)
 11 seats to be elected to the conseil communautaire (CC du Canton d'Erstein)

Eschau 

Incumbent mayor: Yves Sublon (DVD)
 29 seats to be elected to the conseil municipal (population in 2017: 5,303 residents)
 1 seats to be elected to the conseil communautaire (Eurométropole de Strasbourg)

Fegersheim 

Incumbent mayor: Thierry Schaal (DVD)
 29 seats to be elected to the conseil municipal (population in 2017: 5,737 residents)
 1 seats to be elected to the conseil communautaire (Eurométropole de Strasbourg )

Geispolsheim 

Incumbent mayor: Sébastien Zaegel (LR)
 29 seats to be elected to the conseil municipal (population in 2017: 7,540 residents)
 1 seats to be elected to the conseil communautaire (Eurométropole de Strasbourg)

Haguenau 

Incumbent mayor: Claude Sturni (DVD)
 39 seats to be elected to the conseil municipal (population in 2017: 34,504 residents)
 23 seats to be elected to the conseil communautaire (CA de Haguenau)

Hœnheim 

Incumbent mayor: Vincent Debes (LR)
 33 seats to be elected to the conseil municipal (population in 2017: 11,215 residents)
 2 seats to be elected to the conseil communautaire (Eurométropole de Strasbourg)

Illkirch-Graffenstaden 

Incumbent mayor: Claude Froehly (PS)
 35 seats to be elected to the conseil municipal (population in 2017: 26,780 residents)
 6 seats to be elected to the conseil communautaire (Eurométropole de Strasbourg )

Lingolsheim 

Incumbent mayor: Yves Bur (LR)
 33 seats to be elected to the conseil municipal (population in 2017: 18,324 residents)
 4 seats to be elected to the conseil communautaire (Eurométropole de Strasbourg)

Molsheim 

Incumbent mayor: Jean-Michel Weber (LR)
 29 seats to be elected to the conseil municipal (population in 2017: 9,312 residents)
 10 seats to be elected to the conseil communautaire (CC de la Région de Molsheim-Mutzig)

Mutzig 

Incumbent mayor: Jean-Luc Schickelé (DVD)
 29 seats to be elected to the conseil municipal (population in 2017: 6,011 residents)
 6 seats to be elected to the conseil communautaire (CC de la Région de Molsheim-Mutzig)

Oberhausbergen 

Incumbent mayor: Cécile Delattre-Van Hecke  (UDI)
 29 seats to be elected to the conseil municipal (population in 2017: 5,381 residents)
 1 seats to be elected to the conseil communautaire (Eurométropole de Strasbourg)

Obernai 

Incumbent mayor: Bernard Fischer (LR)
 33 seats to be elected to the conseil municipal (population in 2017: 11,279 residents)
 13 seats to be elected to the conseil communautaire (CC du Pays de Sainte-Odile)

Ostwald 

Incumbent mayor: Jean-Marie Beutel (PS)
 33 seats to be elected to the conseil municipal (population in 2017: 12,604 residents)
 2 seats to be elected to the conseil communautaire (Eurométropole de Strasbourg )

Val-de-Moder 

Incumbent mayor: Jean-Denis Enderlin (DVD)
 33 seats to be elected to the conseil municipal (population in 2017: 5,096 residents)
 3 seats to be elected to the conseil communautaire (CA de Haguenau)

Reichshoffen 

Incumbent mayor: Hubert Walter (LR)
 29 seats to be elected to the conseil municipal (population in 2017: 5,396 residents)
 8 seats to be elected to the conseil communautaire (CC du Pays de Niederbronn-les-Bains)

Rosheim 

Incumbent mayor: Michel Herr (UDI)
 29 seats to be elected to the conseil municipal (population in 2017: 5,149 residents)
 8 seats to be elected to the conseil communautaire (CC des Portes de Rosheim)

Saverne 

Incumbent mayor: Stéphane Leyenberger (LR)
 33 seats to be elected to the conseil municipal (population in 2017: 11,239 residents)
 17 seats to be elected to the conseil communautaire (CC du Pays de Saverne)

Schiltigheim 

Incumbent mayor: Danielle Dambach (EELV)
 39 seats to be elected to the conseil municipal (population in 2017: 31,894 residents)
 7 seats to be elected to the conseil communautaire (Eurométropole de Strasbourg)

Sélestat 

Incumbent mayor: Marcel Bauer (LR)
 33 seats to be elected to the conseil municipal (population in 2017: 19,252 residents)
 21 seats to be elected to the conseil communautaire (CC de Sélestat)

Souffelweyersheim 

Incumbent mayor: Pierre Perrin (UDI)
 29 seats to be elected to the conseil municipal (population in 2017: 8,001 residents)
 1 seats to be elected to the conseil communautaire (Eurométropole de Strasbourg)

Strasbourg 

Incumbent mayor: Roland Ries (DVG)
 65 seats to be elected to the conseil municipal (population in 2017: 280,966 residents)
 49 seats to be elected to the conseil communautaire (Eurométropole de Strasbourg)

Vendenheim 

Incumbent mayor: Philippe Pfrimmer (DVD)
 29 seats to be elected to the conseil municipal (population in 2017: 5,664 residents)
 1 seats to be elected to the conseil communautaire (Eurométropole de Strasbourg)

La Wantzenau 

Incumbent mayor: Patrick Depyl (MoDem)
 29 seats to be elected to the conseil municipal (population in 2017: 5,841 residents)
 1 seats to be elected to the conseil communautaire (Eurométropole de Strasbourg)

Wasselonne 

Incumbent mayor: Michèle Eschlimann (LR)
 29 seats to be elected to the conseil municipal (population in 2017: 5,652 residents)
 10 seats to be elected to the conseil communautaire (CC de la Mossig et du Vignoble)

Wissembourg 

Incumbent mayor: Christian Gliech (LREM)
 29 seats to be elected to the conseil municipal (population in 2017: 7,537 residents)
 15 seats to be elected to the conseil communautaire (CC du Pays de Wissembourg)

References 

2020 elections in France
Bas-Rhin
Elections in Bas-Rhin